Richard James Bleiler (born 1959) is an American bibliographer of science fiction, fantasy, horror, crime, and adventure fiction. He was nominated for the Bram Stoker Award for Best Non-Fiction in 2002 and for the Munsey Award in 2019. He is the son of Everett F. Bleiler.  

Bleiler was appointed reference librarian and selector for the humanities at the University of Connecticut's Homer Babbidge Library in 1994. As of 2020 he is the Collections and Humanities Librarian.

Bibliography

"Stephen King." Supernatural Fiction Writers: Fantasy and Horror, 2: A. E. Coppard to Roger Zelazny, Everett Franklin (ed.) Bleiler, Scribner's, 1985, pp. 1037–1044. 
Marcel Proust at UAB : a checklist of Proust holdings at the Mervyn H. Sterne Library (with  Dieu Van Tong). University of Alabama at Birmingham, 1988.
 "Forgotten Giant: A Brief History of Adventure Magazine." Extrapolation: A Journal of Science Fiction and Fantasy, vol. 30, no. 4, 1989, pp. 309–323.
The Index to Adventure Magazine. Two vols. Mercer Island, WA : Starmont House, 1990.
Science-Fiction: The Early Years (with Everett F. Bleiler). Kent, Ohio : Kent State University Press, 1990.
The Annotated Index to The Thrill Book.  San Bernardino, Calif. : Borgo Press, 1991.
"Robert S. Hichens." Late-Victorian and Edwardian British Novelists: First Series, George M. (ed. and introd.) Johnson, Gale, 1995, pp. 106–119. Dictionary of Literary Biography (DLB): 153. 
"Edwin L. Arnold." British Fantasy and Science-Fiction Writers Before World War I, Darren (ed. and introd.) Harris-Fain, Gale, 1997, pp. 23–26. Dictionary of Literary Biography (DLB): 178. 
"John Davys Beresford." British Fantasy and Science-Fiction Writers Before World War I, Darren (ed. and introd.) Harris-Fain, Gale, 1997, pp. 27–34. Dictionary of Literary Biography (DLB): 178. 
Internet training in ARL libraries : a SPEC kit. (with Jon E. Cawthorne). Washington, DC : Association of Research Libraries, Office of Management Services, c1997.
"Edgar Wallace." Mystery and Suspense Writers: The Literature of Crime, Detection, and Espionage, I-II, Robin W. (ed. and introd.) Winks and Maureen (ed.) Corrigan, Scribner's, 1998, pp. 943–955.
Science-fiction : the Gernsback years (with Everett F. Bleiler). Kent, Ohio : Kent State University Press, c1998.
 "Science fiction writers : Critical studies of the major authors from the early nineteenth century to the present day" (2nd ed.). New York: Charles Scribner's. 1999
  Reference Guide to Mystery and Detective Fiction. Englewood, Colo. : Libraries Unlimited, 1999.
Networked Information Resources : A SPEC Kit (with Terry Plum). Washington, D.C. : Association of Research Libraries, Office of Leadership and Management Services, c1999.
"George Vaux Bacon: Forgotten Writer, Intriguing Person." Dime Novel Roundup: A Magazine Devoted to the Collecting, Preservation and Study of Old-Time Dime and Nickel Novels, Popular Story Papers, Series Books, and Pulp Magazines, vol. 68, no. 4 [658], Aug. 1999, pp. 127–136.
 "Thomas Burke." Late-Victorian and Edwardian British Novelists: Second Series, George M. (ed. and introd.) Johnson, Thomson Gale, 1999, pp. 40–49. Dictionary of Literary Biography (DLB): 197. 
Supernatural fiction writers : contemporary fantasy and horror. 2nd ed. New York : Charles Scribner’s Sons, 2003.
"Imagination Takes Flight: A Thematic History of the Pulp Magazine." Dime Novel Roundup: A Magazine Devoted to the Collecting, Preservation and Study of Old-Time Dime and Nickel Novels, Popular Story Papers, Series Books, and Pulp Magazines, vol. 72, no. 3-4 [681-82], 2003, pp. 79–111. 
"Street & Smith's Literary Album: A Bibliographic Listing." Dime Novel Roundup: A Magazine Devoted to the Collecting, Preservation and Study of Old-Time Dime and Nickel Novels, Popular Story Papers, Series Books, and Pulp Magazines, Cox, J. Randolph, et al. vol. 73, no. 6 [690], Dec. 2004, pp. 179–250. 
Reference and Research Guide to Mystery and Detective Fiction. Libraries Unlimited, 2004. 
"May Sinclair's Supernatural Fiction." in May Sinclair: Moving Towards the Modern, Andrew J. (ed. and introd.) Kunka and Michele K. (ed. and introd.) Troy, Ashgate, 2006, pp. 123–138. 
"Raised by the Dead: Maturational Gothic in Neil Gaiman's the Graveyard Book." in 21St Century Gothic: Great Gothic Novels since 2000, Daniel (ed. and introd.) Olson and S. T. (foreword) Joshi, Scarecrow, 2011, pp. 269–278. 
Political Future Fiction: Speculative and Counter-Factual Politics in Edwardian Fiction. Bleiler, Richard (ed.) (with Kate MacDonald (general ed.) and Stephen Donovan (ed.)) London, England: Pickering & Chatto, 2013. 
"Visionary Star-Treader: The Speculative Writings of Clark Ashton Smith." in Pulp Fiction of the '20S and '30S, Gary (ed. and introd.) Hoppenstand, Salem, 2013, pp. 66–83. 
"The Fantastic Pulp Fiction of Frank Belknap Long." in Pulp Fiction of the '20S and '30S, Gary (ed. and introd.) Hoppenstand, Salem, 2013, pp. 148–165.
The Strange Case of the Angels of Mons:  Arthur Machen's World War I Story, the Insistent Believers, and His Refutations.  Jefferson, NC:  McFarland, 2015.

References

External links

Modern Horror Fiction: A Select Who's Who by Richard Bleiler at the Dark Echo Website
  

American bibliographers
American librarians
1959 births
Living people
University of Connecticut people